There are two official languages of Norfolk Island, English and Norfuk.  English, due to the influence of Great Britain and Australia, the two colonial powers who administered Norfolk Island, is the dominant language of the pair.  Norfuk, a creole language based on English and Tahitian and brought to the island by the descendants of the Bounty mutineers from Pitcairn Island was spoken by 580 people according to the 1989 census. It is closely related to Pitkern spoken on Pitcairn Island. Many Norfolk Islanders also speak Fijian.

See also
 Australian English
 Norfuk language

References

External links

Norfolk Island culture
Languages of Oceania
Norfolk Island
Society of Norfolk Island